Asprières is a commune in the Aveyron department in the Occitanie region of southern France.

The inhabitants of the commune are known as Aspriérois or Aspriéroises.

Geography
Asprières is located some 10 km south-east of Figeac just east of Capdenac-Gare. Access to the commune is by the D40 road from Bouillac in the north-east passing south-west through the heart of the commune and the village and continuing south-west to Salles-Courbatiès. The D994 road from Capdenac-Gare passes down the western border of the commune then east to the village and onwards to Les Albres in the south-east. The tortuous D144 road from Bouillac to Les Albres passes through the neck of the commune in the north-east. A railway runs along the northern border of the commune going east from Capdenac-Gare but there is no station in the commune. The nearest station is in Bouillac. Apart from the village there are the hamlets of Bor, Vernet le Haut, La Coustille, Labrol, Querbes, Paysan, and La Montjouvie - all in the north of the commune - and La Marmiesse east of the village. The commune is mixed forest and farmland with particularly large forests in the north and north-east.

The Lot river forms all of the northern border of the commune with the department of Lot on the other side of the river. The Lot flows from east to west eventually joining the Garonne north of Bordeaux. Several streams rise in the commune and flow north to join the Lot including the: Ruisseau de Prat Rigal, Ruisseau de Querbes, and the Ruisseau de Roucayrol. The Ruisseau de l'Estang forms the south-eastern border of the commune as it flows south-west to join the Ruisseau de Tournac which forms the southern border of the commune as it flows west.

Neighbouring communes and villages

History
In 1790 Asprières was the capital of a canton. In 1922 it lost its status as capital which was transferred to Capdenac-Gare.

Heraldry

Administration

List of Successive Mayors

Demography
In 2017 the commune had 733 inhabitants.

Sites and monuments

In the Parish Church of Saint-Martial is an item registered as a historical object:
Painting and its frame: The last communion of Saint Jerome (1885)

Bibliography
Christian-Pierre Bedel, preface by Jacques Dournes, Capdenac, Los Aures, Asprièras, Balaguièr, Bolhac, Causse-e-Diège, Foissac, Naussac, Salas, Sonnac / Christian-Pierre Bedel e los estatjants del canton de Capdenac, Rodez, Mission départementale de la culture, 1996, Al canton collection, 240 pages, ill., cover ill., 28 cm, ISSN 1151-8375, BnF 36688708h (Occitan)

See also
Communes of the Aveyron department

References

External links
Asprières on Géoportail, National Geographic Institute (IGN) website 
Asprieres on the 1750 Cassini Map

Communes of Aveyron